The 2017 Men's South American Volleyball Club Championship was the ninth official edition of the men's volleyball tournament, played by seven teams from 21 to 25 February 2017 in Montes Claros, Minas Gerais, Brazil. Sada Cruzeiro won its second consecutive title, the fourth overall, and qualified for the 2017 FIVB Volleyball Men's Club World Championship in Poland. Yoandry Leal was elected the Most Valuable Player.

Pools composition

Preliminary round
All times are Brasilia Time (UTC−03:00).

Pool A

|}

|}

Pool B

|}

|}

Final round

Bracket

Fifth place match

|}

Semifinals

|}

Third place match

|}

Final

|}

Final standing

All-Star team

Most Valuable Player
 Yoandry Leal (Sada Cruzeiro)
Best Opposite
 Thomas Edgar (Personal Bolívar)
Best Outside Hitters
 Yoandry Leal (Sada Cruzeiro)
 Rodrigo Leão (Sada Cruzeiro)

Best Setter
 William Arjona (Sada Cruzeiro)
Best Middle Blockers
 Robertlandy Simón (Sada Cruzeiro)
 Pablo Crer (Personal Bolívar) 
Best Libero
 Alexis González (Personal Bolívar)

Notes

See also
2017 Women's South American Volleyball Club Championship

References

External links
CSV

Volleyball
Men's South American Volleyball Club Championship
Volleyball
Men's South American Volleyball Club Championship
Sport in Minas Gerais
February 2017 sports events in South America